Our Lady of Mount Carmel is a title for Mary, mother of Jesus. It may also refer to:

Our Lady of Mount Carmel Catholic Church (disambiguation), in various locations
Convent of Our Lady of Mount Carmel (disambiguation), in various locations
Monastery of Our Lady of Mount Carmel in Finland
Our Lady of Mount Carmel Cemetery (Wyandotte, Michigan)
Order of the Brothers of Our Lady of Mount Carmel

Schools
Our Lady of Mount Carmel Learning Center (Mount Carmel La Salle), Roxas City, Philippines
Our Lady of Mount Carmel School (Essex, Maryland)
Our Lady of Mount Carmel High School (Wyandotte, Michigan)
Our Lady of Mount Carmel Secondary School, Mississauga, Ontario, Canada
Our Lady of Mount Carmel Elementary School (Kentucky)
Our Lady of Mount Carmel Elementary School, Windsor, Ontario, Canada